The following is about the qualification rules and the quota allocation for the bobsleigh at the 2014 Winter Olympics.

Qualification Rules
A maximum of 170 quota spots are available to athletes to compete at the games. A maximum 130 men and 40 women may qualify. The qualification is based on the world rankings of January 20, 2014. Pilots must compete in five different races on three different tracks during the 2012/13 season or 2013/14 season. Men pilots must be in the top 50 of the world rankings, while women need to be in the top 40. Each continent (Africa, Americas, Asia, Europe and Oceania) and the hosts are allowed to enter a sled provided they meet the above standard. For each men's event 30 sleds will be allowed to compete (maximum of three NOCs with three sleds and six NOCs with two sleds). For the women's event there will be a total of 20 sleds allowed to compete (maximum of two NOCs with three sleds, four NOCs with two sleds).

Qualification timeline
Races from October 1, 2013 until January 19 will apply to qualification for the Olympics.  In general this means that the Olympic field is established by using the first seven world cup races of the 2013-14 season, but also includes results from intercontinental, Europe, and America cup races.   Four sleds will then be allocated in both men's categories, and three in the women's, to either host or continental representation.  Unused or reallocated spots will be filled by January 27, 2014.

Quota allocation
The following summary is not indicative of assurance of Olympic qualification, but of how the allocations would be represented based on the current FIBT rankings.

Current summary

Most countries have athletes that crossover between the two-men and four-men events. Romania and the United States are the only two countries which have some turnover between the two-men and four-man teams.

Two man
Final ranking by nation (as of January 18, 2013).

 Netherlands qualified two sleds, but elected to send only one.
 The final four sleds are given to fulfill continental representation (Australia), and then to the top nations not previously qualified (Poland, Jamaica, Serbia).
 Czech Republic received the unused quota spot from the Netherlands. Slovakia was ranked higher, but also declined the spot.

Four man
Final ranking by nation (as of January 19, 2014).

 Switzerland rejected one of its two qualified sleds. 
 The final four sleds (Brazil, Poland, Slovakia, Serbia) are allocated at the end to the top nations not previously qualified.
 Slovakia received the unused quota spot from Switzerland.

Two women
Final ranking by nation (as of January 19, 2014).

 Italy rejected using its quota it qualified. 
 The final three sleds are given to fulfill continental representation (South Korea), and then to the top nations not previously qualified (Brazil and Italy). 
 Romania received the unused quota spot from Italy.

References

Qualification for the 2014 Winter Olympics
Qualification